Headman may refer to:

 Village head, an occupation
 Dibao, a village-level Qing official
 Tusi (Chinese: , p tǔsī), tribal leaders recognized or appointed by the Chinese over nearby peoples
 Penghulu, a Malay local chief
 Headman Shabalala (1945–1991), South African singer
 Headman (G.I. Joe), a fictional villain in the G.I. Joe universe